The VG-20 is a Spain dual carriageway that circles Vigo in the province of Pontevedra.

A tunnel is under construction under the Park of Castrelos that would join Avenida De Madrid (the main entrance to the Center of Vigo from the East) with the First Belt.

Roads in Spain
Vigo